Leone Hallie Lane (November 17, 1908 – March 28, 1993) was an American actress of the silent film era and the time of the early sound films.

Biography
 
Leone Hallie Lane was born on November 17, 1908, in Boston, Massachusetts. She was an actress, known for Wolf Song (1929), Stairs of Sand (1929) and The Case of Lena Smith (1929).

Death
She died on March 28, 1993 in Los Angeles, California of arteriosclerotic cardiovascular disease. Lane is buried at Forest Lawn Memorial Park in Glendale, California.

Filmography

References

External links

1908 births
1993 deaths
20th-century American actresses
American film actresses
American silent film actresses
Actresses from Boston